Pål Mathiesen (born on 14 August 1977), also known as "Athera" and "Shady Blue", is a Norwegian singer, best known as the former lead vocalist of the black/thrash metal band Susperia. He is also the former lead vocalist of Chrome Division and a session live vocalist in Borknagar.

In 2009, Athera suffered a heart attack which resulted in major open-heart surgery.

Discography

Vanaheim 
En Historie (1997)
Helter og Kongers Fall (1998)

Susperia 
Illusions of Evil (demo, 2000)
Predominance (Nuclear Blast, 2000)
Vindication (Nuclear Blast, 2002)
Unlimited (Tabu, 2004)
Devil May Care (EP, Tabu, 2005)
Cut from Stone (Tabu, 2007)
Attitude (Candlelight Records, 2009)

Chrome Division 
 Third Round Knockout (Nuclear Blast, 2011)
 Infernal Rock Eternal (2014)

References

1977 births
Living people
Norwegian black metal musicians
Place of birth missing (living people)
Norwegian songwriters
Chrome Division members
Susperia members
Borknagar members